Voss Folk High School is a private folk school in Voss, Norway.

The school is located at the village of Seim west of Vossevangen   in Hordaland.
It was established in 1895 by educators  Olaus Alvestad (1866–1903) and Lars Eskeland (1867–1942).
The school follows the  ideology  inspired by  clergyman and teacher N. F. S. Grundtvig (1783–1872)  and his principals of education. It is today owned by an independent foundation.

References

External links
Voss Folkehøgskule website

Folk high schools in Norway
Voss
Education in Vestland
Educational institutions established in 1895
1895 establishments in Norway